The 2012 Finlandia Trophy was an international figure skating competition in the 2012–13 season. The 17th edition of the annual event was held on October 5–7, 2012 at the Barona Arena in Espoo. Skaters competed in the disciplines of men's singles, ladies' singles, ice dancing, and synchronized skating on the senior level.

Competitors
The initial entries were:

Overview
Spain's Javier Fernández won the men's short program ahead of Japan's Yuzuru Hanyu and the United States' Richard Dornbush. Hanyu placed first in the free program and won the title while Dornbush moved up to take the silver and Fernandez slipped to third. Johnny Weir made his return to competition at Finlandia Trophy after a two-season absence.

In the ladies' event, Finland's Kiira Korpi was first in the short program, followed by Russia's Yulia Lipnitskaya and the United States' Mirai Nagasu. Yulia Lipnitskaya won the free program and the overall ladies' event.

Canada's Tessa Virtue / Scott Moir withdrew before the event due to a slight muscle strain in Moir's neck. Russia's Ekaterina Bobrova / Dmitri Soloviev won the short dance ahead of Italy's Anna Cappellini / Luca Lanotte and the United States' Madison Hubbell / Zachary Donohue. Cappellini and Lanotte were first in the free dance by a small margin but it was not enough to overtake Bobrova and Soloviev for the gold.

In the synchronized skating competition, included in Finlandia Trophy for the first time, the Finnish Team Unique took gold by a margin of 2.48 points to the fellow Finnish Rockettes, who in turn were closely followed by the Russian Paradise by a margin of only 0.61 points.

Results

Men

Ladies

Synchronized skating

References

External links
 2012 Finlandia Trophy results
 Finlandia Trophy at the Finnish Figure Skating Association

2012
Finlandia Trophy
Finlandia Trophy